The 1968 Villanova Wildcats football team represented the Villanova University during the 1968 NCAA University Division football season. The head coach was Jack Gregory, coaching his second season with the Wildcats. The team played their home games at Villanova Stadium in Villanova, Pennsylvania.

Schedule

References

Villanova
Villanova Wildcats football seasons
Villanova Wildcats football